California Gold Rush is a 1946 American Western film in the Red Ryder film series directed by R. G. Springsteen and written by Robert Creighton Williams. The film stars Wild Bill Elliott, Robert Blake, Alice Fleming, Peggy Stewart, Russell Simpson and Dick Curtis. It was released on February 4, 1946 by Republic Pictures.

Cast  
Wild Bill Elliott as Red Ryder
Robert Blake as Little Beaver
Alice Fleming as Duchess Wentworth
Peggy Stewart as Hazel Parker
Russell Simpson as Colonel Parker
Dick Curtis as Chopin 
Joel Friedkin as Murphy
Kenne Duncan as Henchman Felton
Tom London as Sheriff Peabody
Monte Hale as Pete 
Wen Wright as The Idaho Kid
Dickie Dillon as Broken Arrow
Mary Arden as Stage Passenger
Jack Kirk as Stage Passenger

References

External links 
 

1946 films
1940s English-language films
American Western (genre) films
1946 Western (genre) films
Republic Pictures films
Films directed by R. G. Springsteen
Films based on comic strips
Films based on American comics
American black-and-white films
1940s American films
Red Ryder films